Salar del Huasco is a salt flat dotted with ponds and salt marshes, and seasonally partially covered with water, in northern Chile. It is the centerpiece of the recently created Salar del Huasco National Park and was designated Ramsar Site 874 on 2 December 1996. The area has a significant population of flamingos.

The salt flat is probably bordered by a fault on its western side, and a river delta forms much of its northern edge; it is now crisscrossed by stream channels. In the Pleistocene the salt flat was covered by a lake that was identified through its clay and diatomite sediments and which has left well preserved shorelines and terraces.

References

Salt flats of Chile
Ramsar sites in Chile
National parks of Chile
Protected areas of Tarapacá Region
Landforms of Tarapacá Region